The Kate Kelly was a 126-foot wood-hulled two-masted schooner that sank in 1895 off the coast of Wind Point, Wisconsin, United States. In 2007 the shipwreck site was added to the National Register of Historic Places.

History
The Kate Kelly was built in Tonawanda, New York by John Martel in 1867, a canaller designed to carry maximum cargo through the Welland Canal between Lakes Erie and Ontario, with inches to spare. Her homeport was Buffalo, New York and later Oswego, New York. She carried cargo such as corn, grain, coal and iron from ports including those in  Chicago, Illinois and Milwaukee, Wisconsin to ports in places such as Canada.

In May 1895 the Kate Kelly left Alpena, Michigan with a load of hemlock railroad ties bound for Chicago. After stopping at Sheboygan, Wisconsin, she carried on with her journey. On the morning of May 13, a storm broke out across Lake Michigan, sinking several ships including the Kate Kelly. There were no survivors and the bodies of the crew were never found.

The ship lies two miles east of Wind Point Light in 55 feet of water, broken up in sections on the lakebed.

References

External links

Shipwrecks of Lake Michigan
Shipwrecks of the Wisconsin coast
Shipwrecks on the National Register of Historic Places in Wisconsin
Racine County, Wisconsin
National Register of Historic Places in Racine County, Wisconsin